Protein odd-skipped-related 2 is a protein that in humans is encoded by the OSR2 gene. In mice, it is involved in the development of the palate and in suppressing the formation of teeth after the eruption of adult teeth.

References

Further reading

See also
OSR1